Beulah Township is a township in Cass County, Minnesota, United States. The population was 57 as of the 2000 census. Beulah Township was named for Beulah Olds, a pioneer settler.

Geography

Unincorporated communities
 Mae

Lakes
 Edna Lake
 Egg Lake
 Little Reservoir Lake
 Lake Leavitt (east half)
 Morrison Lake
 Oxbox Lake (east quarter)
 Reservoir Lake
 Rice Pad Lake
 Schafer Lake
 Tank Lake
 Third Guide Lake
 Wren Lake (vast majority)

Adjacent townships
 Smoky Hollow Township (north)
 Little Pine Township, Crow Wing County (south)
 Crooked Lake Township (west)
 Thunder Lake Township (northwest)

Demographics
As of the census of 2000, there were 57 people, 28 households, and 19 families residing in the township. The population density was 1.6 people per square mile (0.6/km2). There were 112 housing units at an average density of 3.2/sq mi (1.2/km2). The racial makeup of the township was 98.25% White, and 1.75% from two or more races.

There were 28 households, out of which 14.3% had children under the age of 18 living with them, 64.3% were married couples living together, and 28.6% were non-families. 28.6% of all households were made up of individuals, and 10.7% had someone living alone who was 65 years of age or older. The average household size was 2.04 and the average family size was 2.40.

In the township the population was spread out, with 10.5% under the age of 18, 7.0% from 25 to 44, 54.4% from 45 to 64, and 28.1% who were 65 years of age or older. The median age was 55 years. For every 100 females, there were 159.1 males. For every 100 females age 18 and over, there were 142.9 males.

The median income for a household in the township was $26,875, and the median income for a family was $25,000. Males had a median income of $51,250 versus $38,750 for females. The per capita income for the township was $16,613. There were 16.7% of families and 15.9% of the population living below the poverty line, including 75.0% of under eighteens and none of those over 64.

References
 United States National Atlas
 United States Census Bureau 2007 TIGER/Line Shapefiles
 United States Board on Geographic Names (GNIS)

Townships in Cass County, Minnesota
Brainerd, Minnesota micropolitan area
Townships in Minnesota